The term Finnish Landrace can refer to any of the following breeds of livestock originating in Finland:

 Finnish Landrace sheep, or Finnsheep
 Finnish Landrace goat